Aiguille de la Grande Sassière is a mountain in the Graian Alps, on the boundary between the Aosta Valley (northern Italy) and the French department of Savoie.

On the Italian side, it marks the end of the Valgrisenche; on the French side it commands the Val d'Isère.

References

Mountains of Aosta Valley
Mountains of Savoie
Mountains of the Graian Alps
Alpine three-thousanders
Three-thousanders of Italy
Three-thousanders of France